Botula fusca, or the Cinnamon mussel, is a species of bivalve mollusc in the family Mytilidae. It can be found along the Atlantic coast of North America, ranging from North Carolina to the West Indies and Bermuda.

References

Mytilidae
Bivalves described in 1791
Taxa named by Johann Friedrich Gmelin